is a national university in Joetsu, Niigata, Japan, founded in 1978.

External links
 Official website

Educational institutions established in 1978
Japanese national universities
Teachers colleges in Japan
Universities and colleges in Niigata Prefecture
1978 establishments in Japan
Jōetsu, Niigata